Andres Alver (born 23 December 1953) is an Estonian architect.

Born in Tartu, from 1961 to 1972, Alver studied in the 2nd Secondary School of Tartu (today's Miina Härma Gymnasium). From 1972, Alver studied in the State Art Institute of the Estonian SSR (today's Estonian Academy of Arts) in the department of architecture, graduating in 1977.

From 1977 to 1990, Alver worked in the architectural office of the S. M. Kirov collective farm. From 1990 to 2006, Alver worked in the architectural bureau Alver&Trummal OÜ. From 2006 to present Alver has worked in the A. Alver Architects OÜ architectural office.

The works of Alver from the 1980s include a recreational home in Loksa, restaurant Toidutare in Kose-Risti and a shop in Tallinn. Most notable works by Alver after the 1990s include restaurant Toidutare in Pirita, De La Gardie department store, City Plaza office building and the new design of the Vabaduse Väljak (Freedom Square) in Tallinn.

Alver is currently an editorial board member of Ehituskunst: Estonian Architectural Review magazine. He resides in the  rural municipality of Viimsi, Estonia and is a professor of urban design at the Estonian Academy of Arts.

Alver is a member of the Union Of Estonian Architects.

Works
children's playground in the S.M Kirov collective farm center, Viimsi, 1980
recreational home in Loksa, 1981
apartment building in Raua street, Tallinn, 1991
restaurant Toidutare in Pirita, 1992 (with Tiit Trummal)
De La Gardie department store in Tallinn old town, 1999 (with T. Trummal)
rencstruction of an old hospital to a hotel in Roosikrantsi street, Tallinn, 1997, (with T. Trummal)
Ferrum department store in Kuressaare, Saaremaa, 2002, (with T. Trummal)
City Plaza office building in Tallinn, 2006, (with T. Trummal)
new design of the Freedom Square, Tallinn, 2009 (with T. Trummal, Veljo Kaasik)

Competitions
Extension of the 2nd Secondary School of Tallinn, 1981
Arktikum in Rovaniemi, 1983
Harju street in Tallinn, 1987; 1. prize
Hotel and conference center in Pirita, 1992; 1. prize
New design for the Freedom Square, Tallinn, 1998; 1. prize
New Townhall of Tallinn, 2009; 2. prize

References

Sources

Union of Estonian Architects, members, Andres Alver
Ingrid Lillemägi: Ferrum Centre in Saaremaa in Kuressaare, MAJA 2-2003
Kurg Andres: From Post-Socialism to the City of the Spectacle. Two Commercial Buildings in Tallinn – City Plaza and 4 Rävala Avenue, MAJA 1-2007
 Vabaduse väljak (Liberty Square), Tallinn. Q&A with Andres Alver, Tiit Trummal and Veljo Kaasik, MAJA 3-2009

External links
Estonian Institute: Estonian Art 1' 2001. Harbour area - boulevard into the 21st century

1953 births
Estonian architects
Living people
People from Tartu
Estonian Academy of Arts alumni
Academic staff of the Estonian Academy of Arts